The 2018 FIBA Under-17 Basketball World Cup (Spanish: Copa del Mundo de Baloncesto FIBA Sub-17 2018) was the 5th edition of the FIBA Under-17 Basketball World Cup, the biennial international men's youth basketball championship contested by the U17 national teams of the member associations of FIBA.

It was hosted by Rosario and Santa Fe, Argentina, from 30 June to 8 July 2018. The United States won their fifth title at the Under-17 World Cup, after defeating France in the final.

Bids
The host was chosen in 2017 it was decided to be held in Argentina over Bulgaria which will host in 2020, it also beat out Israel.

Qualified teams

Draw
The draw was held on 14 March 2018 in Rosario, Argentina.

Preliminary round
All times are local (UTC–3).

Group A

Group B

Group C

Group D

Final round

Round of 16

9–16th classification playoffs

9–16th place quarterfinals

13–16th place semifinals

15th place game

13th place game

9–12th place semifinals

Eleventh place game

Ninth place game

Quarterfinals

5–8th classification playoffs

5–8th place semifinals

Seventh place game

Fifth place game

Semifinals

Third place game

Final

Final standings

Statistics and awards

Statistical leaders

Points

Rebounds

Assists

Blocks

Steals

Awards

All-Tournament Team
 André Curbelo
 Killian Hayes
 Jalen Green
 Vernon Carey Jr.
 Oumar Ballo

Marketing
The logo and brand identity of the 2018 FIBA Under-17 Basketball World Cup was unveiled during the Argentina-Uruguay 2019 FIBA Basketball World Cup Americas qualifier match held in 23 February 2018 in Olavarría. The logo design was inspired from the Flag of Argentina. The ball represents the sun of the flag while the hands depicted contesting a tip off was derived from the two blue bands of the flag. The hands are meant to evoke a "sense of a journey unfolding". The brand identity used for the tournament had its sun as its primary symbol which is meant to symbolize the "new stars that will rise and shine" in the tournament.

References

External links
Official website

2018
under
FIBA Under-17 Basketball World Cup
2018 in youth sport
International basketball competitions hosted by Argentina
2018 in Argentine sport
Youth sport in Argentina